Ideal Lofts is an architecturally noted low-rise soft loft condominium apartment building in Toronto, Ontario, Canada. It is located at Markham Street and College Street in the downtown neighbourhoods of Little Italy and Trinity–Bellwoods. The project was developed by Context and designed by Peter Clewes, Prishram Jain and Robert Cadeau of architectsAlliance. Cecconi Simone and Crayon Design designed the interiors. The building was registered on August 19, 2002.

Description
The building's design received an "honourable mention" at the City of Toronto’s Architecture and Urban Design Awards 2003. One judge noted that "it's a very impressive example of the Toronto urban loft-housing model." According to a multiple award winning City of Toronto study the building is a good precedent of a context sensitive and well-massed mid-rise building. It is respectful of the neighbourhood houses along Markham Street to the south. The massing, materials, and façade of the building take their cue from three neighbouring 19th century warehouse buildings each with a strong  red brick base. The three buildings are: 474 Bathurst St, Pedlar People Building at 473-489 College St, and the Ladies Wear Building at 559 College St. The City of Ottawa Design and Planning Guidelines also make reference to Ideal Lofts. According to Robert Freedman, architect and then director of urban design for the City of Toronto, Ideal Lofts is part of a trend toward better designed condos in Toronto. The name Ideal Lofts comes from the Ideal Restaurant Supply store which previously stood on the site. 

The nine-story brick and precast concrete condo has 68 units from one bedroom studios to three-bedroom penthouses. Dimension range from: 1 bedroom: 514–700 ft2, 1+1 bedroom: 700–800 ft2, 2 bedroom: 800–1300 ft2, and penthouse: 1260–2232 ft2. The units per floor each have different layouts. All have floor-to-ceiling windows. The sixth and eighth floors are two-story lofts with glass and concrete terraces. Many units have permanent, unobstructed views of residential streets lined with houses. South facing units overlook neighboring back gardens beyond the grasses and trees on the condo's lower green roof and a section of Lake Ontario is still in view for many. To the west and north, the view takes in treetops and heritage buildings. The units facing either south or west have terraces or balconies. The lofts facing north have juliet balconies. The few amenities include a meeting/party room, indoor parking and storage.

See also 
SP!RE
Tip Top Tailors Building

References

External links 
 Ideal Condominium by Context Development
 Ideal Lofts on TACT Architecture (Prishram Jain was then Senior Design Associate at architectsAlliance)
 Ideal Lofts on Emporis
 Ideal Lofts on UrbanDB

Residential condominiums in Canada
Residential buildings in Toronto